Rzeszów is the largest city in southeastern Poland. It is located on both sides of the Wisłok River in the heartland of the Sandomierz Basin. Rzeszów has been the capital of the Subcarpathian Voivodeship (province) since 1 January 1999, and is also the seat of Rzeszów County.

The history of Rzeszów dates back to the Middle Ages. It received city rights and privileges from King Casimir III the Great in 1354. Local trade routes connecting Europe with the Middle East and the Ottoman Empire resulted in the city's early prosperity and development. In the 16th century, Rzeszów had a connection with Gdańsk and the Baltic Sea. It also experienced growth in commerce and craftsmanship, especially under local rulers and noblemen. Following the Partitions of Poland, Rzeszów was annexed by the Austrian Empire and did not regain its position until it returned to Poland after World War I.

Rzeszów has found its place in the group of the most elite cities in Poland, with growing number of investments, rapid progress and a very high standard of living. In 2011 Forbes awarded Rzeszów with the second place in the ranking of the most attractive semi-large cities for business. Moreover, the city is home to a number of higher education schools and foreign consulates. Rzeszów is also developing as a regional tourist destination; its Old Town, Main Market Square, churches and synagogues are among the best preserved in the country.

In recent years, the population of Rzeszów has grown from 159,000 (2005) to over 196,000 (2019). Further plans for extending the city's borders include incorporating surrounding counties to strengthen its function as a metropolitan center in southeastern Poland. Rzeszów is served by an international airport and is a member of Eurocities.

History

In the area of Rzeszów, the first early European modern humans appeared in the late Paleolithic Age; archaeologists have excavated a tool made in that period at site Rzeszów 25. In the mid-6th century BC, the first farmers came to the area of the city, most likely through the Moravian Gate. Later on, Rzeszów was a settlement of the Lusatian culture, which was followed by the Przeworsk culture.

In the 5th century, the first Slavs appeared in the area, which is confirmed by numerous archaeological findings. Most probably, Rzeszów was then inhabited by the Vistulans. In the 10th century, it became part of the emerging Duchy of Poland. Sometime between 11th and 13th century the town was conquered and subsequently annexed by the East Slavic Ruthenians from the weakened and fragmented Polish state (see Testament of Bolesław III Wrymouth). 

Polish rulers of the Piast dynasty recaptured Rzeszów in 1264. In Tarnów, there was a meeting of Prince Bolesław V the Chaste, and Prince Daniel of Kingdom of Galicia–Volhynia, during which both sides agreed that the border would go between Rzeszów and Czudec (Rzeszów belonged to Kingdom of Galicia–Volhynia, while Czudec and Strzyżów to Lesser Poland).

After the reunification of Poland following the fragmentation period, Rzeszów remained in Ruthenian hands until 1340, when King Casimir III the Great eventually recaptured the area, inviting his knights to govern the re-acquired land. According to some sources, at that time Rzeszów was inhabited by the Walddeutsche, and was called Rishof (during World War II, the Germans renamed it Reichshof). The town was granted Magdeburg rights, it had a parish church, a market place and a cemetery, and its total area was some 1,5 km2. Magdeburg rights entitled Rzeszów's local authorities to punish criminals, build fortifications and tax merchants.

In 1458 Rzeszów was burned by the Vlachs and the Tatars. In 1502 the Tatars destroyed it again. Earlier, in 1427, Rzeszów had burned to the ground in a big fire, but the town recovered after these events, thanks to its favorable location on the main West – East (Kraków – Lwów) and North – South (Lublin – Slovakia) trade routes. In the 15th century the first Jews settled in Rzeszów.

The 16th century was the time of prosperity for the town, especially when Rzeszów belonged to Mikołaj Spytek Ligęza (since the 1580s), who invested in infrastructure, building a castle, a Bernardine church and a monastery. Rzeszów then had some 2,500 inhabitants, with a rapidly growing Jewish community. The town was granted several royal rights, including the privilege to organise several markets a year. At that time, Rzeszów finally grew beyond its medieval borders, marked by fortifications.

In 1638 Rzeszów passed into the hands of the powerful and wealthy Lubomirski family, becoming the center of its vast properties. At first, the town prospered and in 1658, the first college was opened there, which now operates as High School Nr 1. The period of prosperity ended, and furthermore, there were several fires and wars, which destroyed the town. 

Rzeszów was first captured by the Swedes during The Deluge, then by the troops of George II Rákóczi leading to the Treaty of Radnot. During the Great Northern War, the Swedes again captured Rzeszów, in 1702, then several different armies occupied the town, ransacking it and destroying houses.

In the mid-eighteenth century, the town's population was composed of Poles (Roman Catholics) and Yiddish Jews in almost equal numbers (50.1% and 49.8%, respectively).

Rzeszów under Austrian rule 
In 1772, following the First Partition of Poland, Rzeszów became part of the Austrian Empire, to which it belonged for 146 years. In the late 18th century, Rzeszów had 3,000 inhabitants. By the mid-19th century, the population grew to around 7,500, with 40% of them Jewish. In 1858, the Galician Railway of Archduke Charles Louis reached Rzeszów, which resulted in further development of the town. In 1888 the first telephone lines were opened, in 1900 – gas street lamps, and in 1911 – a power plant and water system. The population grew to 23,000, with half of the inhabitants being Jews. A number of modern buildings were constructed, most of them in Secession style.

During World War I, several battles took place near the town. Rzeszów was home to a large garrison of the Austro-Hungarian Army, and in the city of Przemyśl, located nearby, there was a major fortress. During the Battle of Galicia in the late summer of 1914, Russian troops moved towards Rzeszów, and on 21 September, they captured it. The first Russian occupation lasted only 16 days, ending after an attack by the Austrians, on 4 October. 

Under Russian pressure, the Austrians were unable to keep the town, and on 7 November, the Russians again appeared in Rzeszów. In the late fall of 1914, the front line was established between Tarnów and Gorlice, and Rzeszów became an important center of the Imperial Russian Army, with large magazines of food and ammunition located there. The Russian occupation lasted until May 1915.

After the Russians were pushed out of Galicia, Rzeszów remained outside the area of military activity. The Austrian administration returned, but wartime reality and damage to the town had a negative effect on the population, and the quality of life deteriorated.

Interwar period
On 12 October 1918, Rzeszów's mayor, together with the town council, sent a message to Warsaw, announcing loyalty to the independent Second Polish Republic. On November 1, after clashes with German and Austrian troops, Rzeszów was liberated, and the next day, mayor Roman Krogulski took a pledge of allegiance to the reborn Polish state. During World War I some 200 residents of Rzeszów died, rail infrastructure was destroyed, as well as approximately 60 houses.

In 1920, Rzeszów became capital of a county in the Lwów Voivodeship. The town grew, and the creation of the Central Industrial Region had an enormous impact on Rzeszów. It became a major center of the defense industry, with PZL Rzeszów opening there in 1937. It was also was home to a large garrison of the Polish Army, with the 10th Motorized Cavalry Brigade stationed there. In 1939, Rzeszów had 40,000 inhabitants, but its dynamic growth was stopped by the Invasion of Poland and outbreak of World War II.

Second World War

On 6-8 September 1939, Rzeszów was bombed by the Luftwaffe. The town was defended by the 10th Cavalry Brigade and 24th Uhlan Regiment from Kraśnik. The German attack began on 8 September in the afternoon, and the Wehrmacht entered Rzeszów the next morning. The Einsatzgruppe I entered the city to commit crimes against the population, and its members co-formed the local German police. Under German occupation, Rzeszów, renamed into Reichshof, became part of the General Government.

The occupiers established a Nazi prison, in which they imprisoned over 1,100 Poles, especially the intelligentsia, arrested in the region between October 1939 and June 1940, during the Intelligenzaktion. Some people were eventually released, some were deported to prisons in Kraków and Tarnów, while many were executed at the prison yard. On 2 November 1939, the Germans carried out mass arrests of local priests and Bernardine friars, and afterwards, they also carried out executions of Polish intelligentsia at the local Bernardine monastery. 

Persecution of Polish intelligentsia was continued with the AB-Aktion, and on 27 June 1940, 104 Poles from the local prison were exterminated in the forest of Lubzina. In 1941, the Germans established a ghetto, whose Jewish inhabitants were later murdered in Bełżec extermination camp (for more information see The Holocaust below).

During the war, Rzeszów was a main center of the Polish Underground State, with the Rzeszów Inspectorate of the Home Army covering several counties. On 25 May, during Action Kosba, Home Army soldiers killed the Gestapo henchmen Friederich Pottenbaum and Hans Flaschke on a Rzeszów street. In the summer of 1944, during Operation Tempest, units of the Home Army attacked German positions in the town, and on 2 August, Rzeszów was in the hands of the Home Army. 

Polish authorities loyal to the Polish government-in-exile tried to negotiate with the Soviets, but without success. The NKVD immediately opened a prison in the cellars of the Rzeszów Castle, sending there a number of Home Army soldiers. On the night of 7/9 October 1944, a Home Army unit under Łukasz Ciepliński attacked the castle, trying to release 400 inmates kept there. The attack failed, and Ciepliński was captured and subsequently executed in 1951.

The Holocaust

Before the outbreak of World War II, the Jews of Rzeszów numbered 14,000, more than one-third of the total population. The town was occupied by the German Army on 10 September 1939 and was renamed "Reichshof". German persecution of the Jews began almost immediately. By the end of 1939, there were 10 forced labour camps in the Rzeszów region and many Jews became slave labourers. Jews were forced to live in the Gestapo-controlled ghetto. 

Many Jews managed to flee to Soviet-occupied eastern Poland. By June 1940, the number of Jews in Rzeszów had decreased to 11,800, of whom 7,800 were pre-war residents of the city; the rest were from the surrounding villages. As in all Jewish ghettos in German-occupied Poland, life in the ghetto was impossible and hundreds died of malnutrition and disease. During the war, some 20,000 Jews were murdered in the ghetto in Rzeszów. This number includes thousands who were sent to Rzeszów only to be deported or murdered soon after arrival.

In the summer of 1942, hundreds were murdered in forests near Rzeszow. Hundreds more were sent to Belzec to be immediately gassed.  Later in 1942, another round up sent nearly 1,500 children to their deaths and their parents to labor camps. In final "Aktions" in the fall of 1943, most Jewish slave labour was transported in Holocaust trains to the newly reopened Szebnie concentration camp. A month later, on 5 November 1943, some 2,800 Jews were deported to Auschwitz and murdered. Most of those who had been sent to labor camps were eventually murdered there or in an extermination camp. 

Of Rzeszów's 14,000 Jews, only 100 survived the war, whether in Rzeszów itself, hiding all over Poland, or in various camps. The secret Polish Council to Aid Jews, "Żegota", established by the Polish resistance movement, operated in the region. Cases are also known of local Poles who were captured and either executed or sent to concentration camps for rescuing and aiding Jews. Poles who saved Jews in other places in the region were also temporarily imprisoned in the local castle or sentenced to death by the local German court. After the war, an additional 600 Rzeszów Jews returned from the Soviet Union. Almost all of them subsequently left Rzeszów and Poland.

People's Republic and present times 

After rumors of the murder of a Christian girl in the city surfaced, on June 1, 1945, the Polish police arrested all of Rzeszów's remaining Jews and led them through the city amidst an angry crowd, while at the same time looting the homes of the arrested Jews. As a result, more than 200 Jews fled Rzeszów, so that a restoration of Jewish life in the city after 1945 failed to materialize.

On 7 July 1945, Rzeszów became capital of the newly created Rzeszów Voivodeship, which consisted of western counties of prewar Lwów Voivodeship, and several counties of prewar Kraków Voivodeship. This decision had a major impact on the city, as it quickly grew. New offices of the regional government were built, and in 1951, several neighbouring villages were included within the city limits of Rzeszów, and the area of the city grew to 39 km2. 

Before the Polish People's Republic deported ethnic Ukrainians to the western "Recovered Territories" in Operation Vistula, the city was a major base of support for the Organization of Ukrainian Nationalists during the Polish anti-communist resistance. 

In 1971 and 1977, further villages were included within the city limits. In early 1981, Rzeszów was a main center of peasant's protests, who occupied local offices for fifty days, which resulted in the signing of the Rzeszów – Ustrzyki Agreement, and the creation of Rural Solidarity.

On 1 January 1999, the city became the capital of Podkarpackie Voivodeship. Its population grew to 170,000, and area to 91,43 km2. 

In 2004, Rzeszów hosted the Central European Olympiad in Informatics (CEOI).

In 2017–2021, Rzeszów's city limits were greatly expanded by including the villages of Bzianka, Miłocin and Pogwizdów Nowy. The area of Rzeszów increased to over 120 square kilometres and more than 188,000 inhabitants.

In 2022 following the February Russian invasion of Ukraine, Rzeszów became a "main artery" and hub for resupply of military material being transshipped to Ukraine from a number of countries of the Western alliance, including Sweden, Turkey, Germany, the U.S., and the Czech Republic.

In June of 2022, Rzeszów formed a partnership agreement with Chernihiv, Ukraine to become sister cities.

Papal visit
In 1991 Pope John Paul II visited Rzeszów. During the celebrations in which nearly 1,000,000 people participated, the pope beatified Bishop Józef Sebastian Pelczar, former bishop of Przemyśl. On 25 March 1992 Pope John Paul II established the new Diocese of Rzeszów. The city of Rzeszów became the administrative center of the new Diocese and the Church of the Sacred Heart became the new city cathedral.

Geography

Climate 
Rzeszów lies in the north temperate zone and has a continental climate with four distinct seasons. It is characterised by a significant variation between hot summers and cold, snowy winters.

In summer temperatures often exceed , and sometimes even . With Rzeszów being near the Carpathian Mountains, there is sometimes a halny – a föhn wind, when the temperature can rise rapidly.

Main sights

 Rzeszów Castle
 The Main Square
Rzeszów Town Hall, built in 1591
 Small (17th century) and Big (18th century, restored 1954–63) Synagogue
 Łańcut Castle
 Podziemia, Tunnels

Demographics
According to GUS data, as of 30 June 2020, Rzeszów had 196 821 inhabitants. In contrast to other cities close to the size of Rzeszów in Poland, the population is growing.

Rzeszów is the 17th largest Polish city in terms of population and the 20th largest city in terms of area.

Culture

Theatres
 Wanda Siemaszkowa Theatre (est. 1944)
 Maska Theatre
 Rzeszów Dance Theatre

Museums
 Ethnographic Museum
 Museum of the City of Rzeszów
 Diocesan Museum
 Rzeszów Castle

Art galleries
 "Szajna" gallery
 "Pod Ratuszem" gallery
 "z Podwórza" gallery
 OPe Photo Gallery

Libraries
 Provincial and City Public Library in Rzeszów
 Rzeszów University Library
 Rzeszów University of Technology Library

Other
 Podpromie Hall
 Artur Malawski Philharmonic Hall

Sports

Resovia Rzeszów
men's volleyball team playing in Polish Volleyball League, 6 times Polish Champions, 3 times Polish Cup winners
one of the oldest men's football teams in Poland (1905 or 1904)
basketball team, Polish Champions 1974/75
Stal Rzeszów
motorcycle speedway team
men's football team
Rzeszów Rockets – American football team

Economy and infrastructure

Industry

Asseco Poland SA (earlier Comp Rzeszów S.A.) – the largest computer software company in Poland
Eastern IT Cluster grouping several IT companies is headquartered in Rzeszów
FIBRAIN – manufacturer in the field of ICT systems
G2A.COM Limited - a global digital marketplace which specializes in gaming products
Goodrich Corporation opened a  manufacturing facility near Rzeszów in November 2010
Novartis International AG (NYSE:NVS) Rzeszów – Gerber Products Company food production facilities
Sanofi-Aventis (NYSE:SNY)
United Technologies Corporation (NYSE:UTX) Pratt & Whitney division (acquired WSK-PZL Rzeszów) – Aerospace engineering including one of the world's two F-16 engine manufacturers
Valeant Pharmaceuticals International (NYSE:VRX) Rzeszów (formerly ICN Polfa Rzeszów)
 – household equipment

Media

Radio
 Radio Rzeszów
 Radio Eska Rzeszów
 Akademickie Radio Centrum
 Katolickie Radio Via
 Radio RES

Press
 Gazeta Codzienna NOWINY
 Super Nowości
 Nasz Dom
 Gazeta Wyborcza Rzeszów

Television
Polish Television (TVP) branch in Rzeszów
 Rzeszów municipal television

Internet
 Rzeszow-Info.pl

Transport

Transit
Rzeszów is located on the main  West-East European E40 Highway, which goes from Calais in France via Belgium, across Germany, Poland, Ukraine and onto Russia and Kazakhstan. Within Poland the E40 follows the  A4 Highway, passing through Wrocław, Katowice, Kraków and Korczowa. The  S19 Expressway connects Rzeszów with Belarus and Slovakia as part of planned Via Carpathia route from the Baltic to the Black Sea.

In recent years, communication has been improved by a modernization of the roads within the city. SCATS traffic system has been implemented.
The A4 highway and S19 expressway act as bypass of the city, running through the northern and eastern districts of Rzeszów.

Airport

As of June 2015 scheduled passenger services are offered by Ryanair, LOT Polish Airlines, and Lufthansa. This is supplemented seasonally by tourist charter flights to typical summer leisure destinations.

Buses
The city operates 49 bus lines including night and airport buses. Rzeszów is also a gateway to the Bieszczady mountains, with many buses heading for Sanok.

Railways
Rzeszów is an important rail hub is on the main west–east rail route; . This runs from Silesia and Kraków, Kraków Main station (Kraków Główny) – Medyka on the Polish eastern border. This line then continues on to Ukraine. Its main railway station was established in the 19th century and apart from it, there are five additional stations in the city: Rzeszów Staroniwa, Rzeszów Zwięczyca, Rzeszów Osiedle, Rzeszów Załęże and Rzeszów Zachodni (freight only). There are also two non-electrified lines stemming from Rzeszów – to Jasło and to Tarnobrzeg.

Education

Universities:
Rzeszów University (established in 2001 from a number of smaller schools)
Rzeszów University of Technology (formed from The Higher Engineering School in 1974)
 Rzeszów University of Technology University of Information Technology and Management in Rzeszów (established in 1996)
 Branches in Dębica, Krosno and Nisko
 Wyższa Szkoła Zarządzania
 WSPiA Rzeszów School of Higher Education (established in 1995)

Notable high schools:
Konarski's Number 1 High School in Rzeszów
John Paul II High School

Twin towns – sister cities

Rzeszów is twinned with:

 Bielefeld, Germany
 Buffalo, United States
 Chernihiv, Ukraine
 Fangchenggang, China
 Gainesville, United States
 Ivano-Frankivsk, Ukraine
 Klagenfurt, Austria
 Košice, Slovakia
 Lamia, Greece
 Lutsk, Ukraine
 Lviv, Ukraine
 Nyíregyháza, Hungary
 Rushmoor, England, United Kingdom
 Satu Mare, Romania
 Split, Croatia
 Truskavets, Ukraine

Notable people

Maurycy Allerhand (1868–1942), lawyer 
Stan Borys (born 1941), singer
Aleksander Cichoń (born 1958), wrestler 
Lukasz Cieplinski (1913–1951), anti-Nazi and anti-Soviet resistance hero
Jerzy Grotowski (1933–1999), theatre director and theorist
Rafał Jonkisz (born 1997), male model
Dawid Kostecki (1981–2019), boxer 
Paweł Kowal (born 1975), politician
Dawid Lampart (born 1990), motorcycle speedway rider
Joanna Lech (born 1984), poet
Hieronim Augustyn Lubomirski (1648–1706), nobleman and military commander
Stanisław Herakliusz Lubomirski (1642–1702), nobleman and politician
Anja Rubik (born 1983), supermodel and philanthropist
Władysław Sikorski (1881–1943), military and political leader, statesman
Mieczysław Boruta-Spiechowicz (1894–1985), military officer
Tomasz Stańko (1942–2018), jazz musician and composer
Justyna Steczkowska (born 1972), singer and songwriter
Józef Szajna (1922–2008), set designer and painter
Rich Szaro (1948–2015), Polish-born American football player
Andrzej Szlachta (born 1947), politician
Józef Zając (1891–1963), general and pilot
Oscar Zehngut (born 1874), violinist
Fred Zinnemann (1907–1997), film director

Gallery

Notes

References

Bibliography

 Moshe Yaari-Wald (ed.), Sefer Zikkaron li-Kehillat Risha (Heb., some Yid. and Eng., 1967).

External links

Gallery 
Rzeszów City Department
Welcome to Rzeszów!
Best infoblog in Rzeszów 
 

 
City counties of Poland
Cities and towns in Podkarpackie Voivodeship

Palaces in Poland
Kingdom of Galicia and Lodomeria
Lwów Voivodeship
Ruthenian Voivodeship
Holocaust locations in Poland